New World is a 2013 South Korean epic crime thriller film written and directed by Park Hoon-jung. It stars Lee Jung-jae, Choi Min-sik, Hwang Jung-min, Park Sung-woong, and Song Ji-Hyo. In the film, Lee Ja-sung (Lee) struggles to balance his role as an undercover police officer with his rise in Korea's crime syndicate.

New World is the first entry in a planned trilogy.

Plot
Lee Ja-Sung (Lee Jung-jae) is an undercover police officer who has been working in Goldmoon International, South Korea's largest corporate crime syndicate. During his 8 years, he is constantly at risk of discovery. Chief Kang (Choi Min-sik) promises to reassign Ja-Sung to an overseas position in the police force, but he continually delays his promise. When Ja-Sung threatens to quit the police force, Chief Kang threatens to leak his true identity to the crime syndicate, which would ensure his painful death.

The chairman of Goldmoon dies in an accident, and two men fight to succeed him. Jung Chung is backed by the Chinese-descended Northmoon clan. Lee Joong-gu is backed by the Jaebum faction.

Chief Kang sets Jung and Joong-gu against each other in hopes that they will defeat each other and clear the path for Jang Su-Ki to become the new chairman. Su-ki is nominally the vice president of the company, but he has no real power. Chief Kang hopes that the Goldmoon company will be weak enough to defeat if led by the weak Su-ki. Chief Kang blackmails Jung and convinces him to leak evidence about Joong-gu  in exchange for a pardon for his own crimes. After he arrests Joong-gu, he informs Joong-gu that Jung betrayed him. Enraged, Joong-gu sends his men to assassinate Jung. Joong-gu's men ambush Jung and fatally wound him. In the meantime, Joong-gu's men break into Ja-Sung's house. Ja-Sung's wife is saved by the police but suffers a miscarriage from shock.

Shattered by Jung's attack and terrified of what Joong-gu will do to him once he is released from prison, Ja-Sung begs Chief Kang to reassign him and let him disappear. Chief Kang refuses to keep his promise and destroys Ja-Sung's police profile to force him to continue to work for Goldmoon. After that Ja-Sung goes to see Jung at the hospital and, before his death, Jung tells Ja-Sung to decide his loyalty. Ja-Sung understands that Jung discovered that he is an undercover cop, but he pretends not to know because of their friendship.

Ja-Sung finally decides to become a bad boy. He takes control of Jung's faction and secures the loyalty of Su-ki's men. When Su-ki attempts to have Ja-Sung executed, his men kill him instead. At Ja-Sung's bidding, his underlings murder Chief Kang, Police Director Ko, and Joong-gu. As a result, Ja-Sung's past undercover identity remains a secret while he smoothly ascends to become the new chairman of Goldmoon.

Cast

Lee Jung-jae – Lee Ja-sung
Choi Min-sik – Section chief Kang Hyung-cheol 
Hwang Jung-min – Jung Chung
Park Sung-woong – Lee Joong-gu
Song Ji-hyo – Shin Woo
Kim Yoon-seong – Oh Seok-mu
Na Kwang-hoon – Yang Moon-seok
Park Seo-yeon – Han Joo-kyung
Choi Il-hwa – Vice Chairman Jang Su-ki
Joo Jin-mo – Police Director Ko
Jang Gwang – Director Yang
Kwon Tae-won – Director Park
Kim Hong-pa – Director Kim
Kim Byeong-ok – Yanbian hobo
Woo Dong-gi – Yanbian hobo
Park In-soo – Yanbian hobo
Jung Young-gi – Yanbian hobo
Park Sang-gyu – policeman
Ryu Sung-hyun – executive
Jung Gi-seop – executive
Lee Woo-jin – executive
Sung Nak-kyung – executive
Jung Mi-sung – detective
Ahn Su-ho – Choi
Son Byung-hee – taxi driver
Han Jae-duk – gang boss
Lee Geung-young – Chairman Seok Dong-chool (cameo)
Ryoo Seung-bum – Constable Kang Cheol-hwa (cameo)
Ma Dong-seok – Section chief Cho Hyung-joo (cameo)

Critical reception
The New York Times called the film "both less bloody and more thoughtful than most of its genre, the shifting-alliances plot becoming more engrossing as it progresses."

Los Angeles Times wrote that "writer-director Park Hoon-jung tells this twisty story of internecine warfare within a Korean corporate crime syndicate with patience, elegance and no small amount of bloodshed."

Salon said that "the rewards come from a satisfying plot, distinctive characters and a series of memorable showpieces, and Park handles all three demands well," and "no one in American movies has made a crime opera this good in years."

Film Business Asia praised it as "the best played and most gripping Korean gangster movie since Yoo Ha's A Dirty Carnival. [...] not only showcases three of South Korea's best actors at the top of their game but also manages to sustain its 2 and a half-hour running time on sheer character drama rather than action or violence."

The film also received many negative reviews as well. David Noh from Film Journal wrote "There's nothing wrong with reworking films like Election and Infernal Affairs. Scorsese won an Oscar for The Departed, his version of the latter. Sadly, Park doesn't bring anything new to the genre, apart from a lot more crane shots and one too many stoic grimaces."

Linda Barnard from Thestar.com gave it 2 stars out of 4, writing "South Korean gangster film New World tries to expand the genre with nods to The Godfather but can't escape the over-the-top acting, expansive violence and overdone story typical of Seoul-made crime dramas."

Slant Magazine also gave it a negative review, stating "Bestowed with a somewhat novel twist, Park Hoon-jung's New World employs the good-guy/bad-guy power dynamic of the typical cop-gangster flick and treats it as the primary source of the story's intrigue. But the mole-imbedded gang war at the heart of this film plays out less like an organic round of Go between cops and criminals than the elaborate scheme of one character operating like a sadistic Creator and wreaking havoc in the lives of his ants."

Box office

Remake
After competing with DreamWorks, Paramount Pictures, and Warner Bros., Sony Pictures picked up the remake rights, reportedly in the mid six-figure range. The production company Vertigo Entertainment will handle the project with producers Roy Lee and Dan Lin, Jon Silk and John Powers Middleton as executive producers, and Will Fetters as screenwriter. The 2018 Tamil movie Chekka Chivantha Vaanam was reported to be the "Indianized version" of this movie owing to its similarity in plot, characterization and the narrative.

Awards and nominations

References

External links 
 
 
 

2013 films
2013 crime drama films
South Korean crime drama films
South Korean neo-noir films
Films about organized crime in South Korea
Films shot in Incheon
Films shot in Daejeon
South Korean gangster films
Films shot in Busan
Next Entertainment World films
2010s Korean-language films
Films directed by Park Hoon-jung
2010s South Korean films